Olivia Grant may refer to:

 Olivia Grant (actress born 1983), performed in the films Stardust and Fishtales, and BBC period drama Lark Rise to Candleford
 Olivia Grant (actress born 1994), now Olive Gray, performed in The Story of Tracy Beaker and EastEnders; daughter of singers David and Carrie Grant